Alexander McCowan (May 27, 1853 – April 17, 1939) was an Ontario farmer and political figure. He represented York East in the Legislative Assembly of Ontario from 1905 to 1913 as a Conservative member.

He was born in Scarborough Township, the son of James W. McCowan, an immigrant from Scotland. He resigned his seat in the provincial assembly in 1913 and was appointed sheriff for York County, serving until 1934. 
In 1891, he married Georgina Ashbridge, from a pioneer family, residing in the eastern end of the growing city of Toronto. 
She died in childbirth later that year. He later married Mary Marshall in 1894. 
McCowan was a dairy farmer and was secretary-treasurer of the Toronto Milk Producers' Association, one of the first milk marketing organizations in Canada. He was also secretary-treasurer for the Scarboro Agricultural Society. Near his farm, the concession road (between Scarborough's Lot 22 and 23) was initially named McCowan's Road after the family, and later changed to McCowan Road, and runs through the former riding in the present cities of Toronto, and Markham.

In the 1905 Ontario general election, McCowan defeated incumbent and former Scarborough Township Reeve John Richardson (Ontario MPP), as he and 25 other Conservative MPP's became the governing party under Premier Sir James P. Whitney. He won two more elections, in 1908 and in 1911.
 
He resigned in 1913, to become Sheriff of York County in a role he served until his 1935 resignation. His replacement in York East was future premier of Ontario (1930-1934) George Stewart Henry.

In retirement, he moved into the City of Toronto, and died there in 1939. He and his family are buried in the St. Andrew's Scarborough Cemetery.

References 
 Canadian Parliamentary Guide, 1912, EJ Chambers

External links 
James McCowan Memorial History Society
 

1853 births
1939 deaths
Progressive Conservative Party of Ontario MPPs